DD Kisan is an Indian agriculture 24-hour television channel, which is owned by Doordarshan and was launched on 26 May 2015. The channel is dedicated to agriculture and related sectors, which disseminates real-time inputs to farmers on new farming techniques, water conservation and organic farming among other information.

History
Ahead of 2014 Indian general election, the BJP had declared that if they come in power they would try setting up a dedicated channel for Indian Farmers. The public broadcaster Prasar Bharti which currently runs the Krishi Darshan program on Doordarshan is one of the longest running programmes on DD National. It was launched on 26 January 1967.

Shows
 2021 - Hum Kisi Se Kam Nahi written by Tanveer Alam
 2015 - Wah Chaudhary Directed  by Vierendrra Lalit and produced by JV Manisha Bajaj and Tarsem Antil (Harikrit Films)

References

External links
Alternate Of DD Kisan 
Official website
DD INDIA Programme Schedule

Doordarshan
Television channels and stations established in 2015
Direct broadcast satellite services
Indian direct broadcast satellite services
Agriculture in India
Television stations in New Delhi
2015 establishments in Uttar Pradesh
Modi administration initiatives
Agricultural television stations